Dam Native is a New Zealand hip hop group formed in 1992.

History

Group Formed 1992
Dam Native is a New Zealand hip hop group that was prominent during the mid- to late-1990s. Its first members consisted of Danny Haimona and Bennett Pomana, now an ex-member. The group formed in 1992 under the name Native Bass and released an album at a time when the industry was virtually devoid of any New Zealand hip hop.

Dam Native focuses on Māori issues and other political issues relating to New Zealand. The group have released two albums, Kaupapa Driven Rhymes Uplifted (sometimes shortened to K.D.R.U.) released in 1997 and ''Aotearoa... Nobody Does It Better" released in 2010.

Dam Native have supported major international acts such as Public Enemy, Ice T, Spearhead, Ben Harper, Red Hot Chili Peppers, Del the Funky Homosapien, Big Day Out Tour New Zealand and Australia, Body Count and The Fugees, became the first "Māori Hip Hop" group to win two NZ music awards.

In 1997, Dam Native won two awards at the NZ Music Awards - the group won Most Promising Group and Daniel Haimona won Most Promising Male Vocalist.  "Behold My Cool Style" music video director Jonathan King was nominated for Best Video.

Live Band Period 2004-2010
Recently, a live band has been put together, normally referred to as Dam Native Live Band to distinguish from MC sets. The group's cypher (an illegal tag or secret street name) was DAMN8V (source: Tom Atkinson, drummer).

Lead vocals: Hype the native
Vocals, guitar: Blackman
BVs: 612
Bass guitar: Jo Keating
Guitar: T.K aka Thomas kani kani
Keys: Timothy William 
Drums: Tomachi aka Tom Atkinson
Percussion: Jo Kopua

Recently in 2022
Radio New Zealand created season two of documentary series NZ Hip Hop Stand Up; Episode 3 of which focuses on Dam Native.

Discography

Videography

External Links
AudioCulture profile

References

New Zealand hip hop groups
Musical groups established in 1992